Problepsis plenorbis is a species of moth of the  family Geometridae. It is found in Peninsular Malaysia, Sumatra and Borneo.

References

External links
The Moths of Borneo

Scopulini
Moths described in 1917
Moths of Asia